Dulce María Quintana Giménez (born 6 February 1989) is a Paraguayan footballer who plays as a defender for Spanish club SE AEM and the Paraguay women's national team.

Club career
Quintana spent most of her early career playing for clubs in Brazil and Chile. She won the 2016 Copa Libertadores Femenina with Club Sportivo Limpeño, before securing a move to RCD Espanyol of Spain in January 2017.

International career
Quintana represented Paraguay at two South American U-20 Women's Championship editions (2006 and 2008). At senior level, she played in four Copa América Femenina editions (2006, 2010 and 2014), captaining her side in the 2022 edition.

International goals
Scores and results list Paraguay's goal tally first

Honours

Club
Sportivo Limpeño
Copa Libertadores Femenina: 2016

References

External links

Profile at CSE players
Dulce Quintana at BDFutbol

1989 births
Living people
Sportspeople from Asunción
Paraguayan women's footballers
Women's association football defenders
São Paulo FC (women) players
RCD Espanyol Femenino players
SE AEM players
Primera División (women) players
Segunda Federación (women) players
Paraguay women's international footballers
Pan American Games competitors for Paraguay
Footballers at the 2019 Pan American Games
Paraguayan expatriate women's footballers
Paraguayan expatriate sportspeople in Brazil
Expatriate women's footballers in Brazil
Paraguayan expatriate sportspeople in Spain
Expatriate women's footballers in Spain